The 2018 United States House of Representatives elections in Michigan was held on November 6, 2018, to elect the 14 U.S. representatives from the state of Michigan, one from each of the state's 14 congressional districts. The elections coincided with the elections of other offices, including a gubernatorial election, other elections to the House of Representatives, elections to the United States Senate, and various state and local elections. The filing deadline for candidates filing for the August 7 primary was April 24, 2018. Unless otherwise indicated, the Cook Political Report has rated the congressional races as safe for the party of the incumbent.

Two seats shifted from Republican to Democratic control. In the 8th Congressional District, Elissa Slotkin defeated incumbent Mike Bishop and in an open seat for the 11th Congressional District, Haley Stevens defeated Lena Epstein. This left Michigan's U.S. House delegation in the 116th United States Congress with seven Democrats and seven Republicans until July 4, 2019, when Justin Amash of the 3rd Congressional District left the Republican Party to become an independent, shifting the balance of power in Michigan's House delegation to a Democratic plurality for the first time since 2011.

Results summary

Statewide

District
Results of the 2018 United States House of Representatives elections in Michigan by district:

District 1

The 1st district consists of the entire Upper Peninsula of Michigan and the northern part of the Lower Peninsula including Alpena, Marquette, and Traverse City. This district has a PVI of R+9. The district, which makes up about 44% of the land area of the state of Michigan, is the second-largest congressional district east of the Mississippi River by land area. The incumbent is Republican Jack Bergman, who has represented the district since 2017. He was elected to replace retiring Representative Dan Benishek with 55% of the vote in 2016. The Cook Political Report has rated this race 'likely Republican.'

Republican primary

Candidates

Nominee
Jack Bergman, incumbent U.S. Representative

Primary results

Democratic primary
Matt Morgan was the only Democrat to file to run. However, Morgan was removed from the ballot because he used a PO box address on his nomination petitions instead of his residential address. Instead, Morgan ran a write-in campaign, hoping to qualify for the ballot by winning at least five percent of the total votes cast in the district for the Democratic gubernatorial primary.  Over 4,800 votes were cast in Marquette County, which would have been enough by itself to qualify Morgan for the ballot.  According to official results, Democrats cast 29,293 write-in votes in the primary for Morgan, more than seven times the 3,781-vote threshold. On August 24, the Board of State Canvassers placed Morgan on the November ballot.

Candidates

Nominee
 Matthew W. Morgan, retired US Marine Corps lieutenant colonel and Iraq War veteran

Withdrawn
 Dwight Brady, professor

Primary results

General election

Endorsements

Polling

Predictions

Results

District 2

The 2nd district is located in West Michigan and is anchored by the suburbs of Grand Rapids such as Kentwood and Wyoming, other cities include Holland and Muskegon. This district has a PVI of R+9. The incumbent is Republican Bill Huizenga, who has represented the district since 2011. He was re-elected to a fourth term with 63% of the vote in 2016.

Republican primary

Primary results

Democratic primary

Candidates

Nominee
 Rob Davidson, ER doctor

Failed to qualify
 Nick Schiller, political newcomer.

Primary results

General election

Endorsements

Polling

Predictions

Results

District 3

The 3rd district is located in inland West Michigan, centered on the city of Grand Rapids, and extends down to Battle Creek and Marshall. This district has a PVI of R+6. The incumbent is Republican Justin Amash, who has represented the district since 2011. He was re-elected to a fourth term with 59% of the vote in 2016.

Republican primary

Candidates

Nominee
 Justin Amash, incumbent U.S. Representative

Failed to qualify
 Matt Hall
 Joe Farrington

Primary results

Democratic primary

Candidates

Nominee
 Cathy Albro, educator

Eliminated in primary
 Fred Wooden, pastor

Primary results

General election

Endorsements

Predictions

Results

District 4

The 4th district is located in Northern and Central Michigan including portions of the Tri-Cities region, specifically Midland, other cites include Mount Pleasant and the northern suburbs of Lansing. This district has a PVI of R+10. The incumbent is Republican John Moolenaar, who has represented the district since 2015. He was re-elected to a second term with 62% of the vote in 2016.

Republican primary

Candidates

Nominee
John Moolenaar, incumbent U.S. Representative

Primary results

Democratic primary

Candidates

Nominee
 Jerry Hilliard

Eliminated in primary
 Zigmond Kozicki

Failed to qualify
 Dion Adams

Primary results

General election

Endorsements

Results

District 5

The 5th district is located along the eastern coast of Michigan, centered on the Tri-Cities region of Mid Michigan, such as Bay City and Saginaw, and stretches down into Flint. This district has a PVI of D+5. The incumbent is Democrat Dan Kildee, who has represented the district since 2013. He was re-elected to a third term with 61% of the vote in 2016.  Kildee considered running for governor in 2018, but decided to run for re-election instead.

Democratic primary

Candidates

Nominee
Dan Kildee, incumbent U.S. Representative

Primary results

Republican primary
Michigan's 5th district has been included on the initial list of Democratic held seats being targeted by the National Republican Congressional Committee in 2018. There is one Republican candidate, Durand resident Travis Wines who lives outside the district.

Candidates

Nominee
Travis Wines

Primary results

General election

Endorsements

Results

District 6

The 6th district is located in Southwestern corner of Michigan, specifically the Michiana region. The district is anchored by Kalamazoo and the surrounding areas including Benton Harbor and Niles. This district has a PVI of R+4. The incumbent is Republican Fred Upton, who has represented the district since 1993 and previously represented the 4th district from 1987 to 1993. He was re-elected to a sixteenth term with 59% of the vote in 2016.  The Cook Political Report has rated this race as 'likely Republican.'

Republican primary

Candidates

Nominee
Fred Upton, incumbent U.S. Representative

Primary results

Democratic primary

Candidates

Nominee
 Matt Longjohn, physician and former National Health Officer for the YMCA

Eliminated in primary
 David Benac, professor
 Rich Eichholz, businessman and biologist
 George Franklin, former Kellogg Company executive
Failed to qualify
 Paul Clements, professor and nominee for this seat in 2014 and 2016
 Eponine Garrod, local activist and quality control chemist

Declined
 Mark Schauer, former U.S. Representative and nominee for governor in 2014

Endorsements

Primary results

General election

Endorsements

Polling

Predictions

Results

District 7

The 7th district is located in Southern Michigan including downtown Lansing and the western suburbs of Ann Arbor including Lodi and Milan, other cities include Adrian, Coldwater, and Jackson. This district has a PVI of R+7. The incumbent is Republican Tim Walberg, who has represented the district since 2011 and previously represented the district from 2007 to 2009. He was re-elected to a fourth consecutive and fifth total term with 55% of the vote in 2016. The Cook Political Report has rated this race as 'likely Republican.'

Republican primary

Candidates

Nominee
Tim Walberg, incumbent U.S. Representative

Primary results

Democratic primary
Michigan's 7th district has been included on the initial list of Republican held seats being targeted by the Democratic Congressional Campaign Committee in 2018.

Candidates

Nominee
 Gretchen Driskell, former state representative, former Saline Mayor and nominee for this seat in 2016

Eliminated in primary
 Steven Friday, Social worker

Primary results

General election

Endorsements

Polling

Predictions

Results

District 8

The 8th district was centered on the state capital, Lansing, and stretches into the northern outskirts of Metro Detroit including Rochester Hills. This district has a PVI of R+4. The incumbent was Republican Mike Bishop, who had represented the district since 2015. He was re-elected to a second term with 56% of the vote in 2016. This race was considered competitive, with the Cook Political Report rating it as 'Tossup' in August 2018. With $28 million spent, it drew the most campaign spending for a U.S. House seat in Michigan's history.

Republican primary

Candidates

Nominee
 Mike Bishop, incumbent U.S. Representative

Eliminated in primary
 Lokesh Kumar

Primary results

Democratic primary
Michigan's 8th district had been included on the initial list of Republican held seats being targeted by the Democratic Congressional Campaign Committee in 2018.

Candidates

Nominee
 Elissa Slotkin, former Acting Assistant Secretary of Defense for International Security Affairs and former United States National Security Council official

Eliminated in primary
 Christopher E. Smith, professor of criminal justice

Failed to qualify
 Darlene Domanik, attorney

Primary results

Libertarian party
 Brian Ellison

General election

Endorsements

Debates
Complete video of debate, October 5, 2018

Polling

Predictions

Results

District 9

The 9th district is located in Metro Detroit including Roseville, Royal Oak, and Warren. This district has a PVI of D+4. The incumbent is Democrat Sander Levin, who has represented the district since 2013 and previously represented the 12th district from 1993 to 2013 and the 17th district from 1983 to 1993. He was re-elected to an eighteenth term with 58% of the vote in 2016. In December 2017, Levin announced his retirement, and that he would not seek re-election in 2018.

Democratic primary

Candidates

Nominee
 Andy Levin, former head of the Michigan Department of Energy, Labor and Economic Growth, Sander Levin's son

Eliminated in primary
 Martin Brook, attorney
 Ellen Lipton, former state representative

Withdrawn
 Steve Bieda, state senator

Declined
 Sander Levin, incumbent representative
 Andy Meisner, Oakland County Treasurer

Endorsements

Polling

Primary results

Republican primary
Michigan's 9th district has been included on the initial list of Democratic held seats being targeted by the National Republican Congressional Committee in 2018.

Candidates

Nominee
 Candius Stearns, businesswoman

Primary results

General election

Endorsements

Results

District 10

The 10th district is located in an area of the Lower Peninsula of Michigan known as The Thumb and parts of the Metro Detroit area including Chesterfield, Macomb, and Port Huron. This is the most Republican friendly district with a PVI of R+13. The incumbent is Republican Paul Mitchell, who has represented the district since 2017. He was elected to replace retiring Representative Candice Miller with 63% of the vote in 2016.

Republican primary

Candidates

Nominee
Paul Mitchell, incumbent U.S. Representative

Primary results

Democratic primary

Candidates

Nominee
Kimberly Bizon

Eliminated in primary
Frank Accavitti Jr.
Michael McCarthy

Primary results

General election

Endorsements

Results

District 11

The 11th district is located in Metro Detroit including Livonia, Novi, and Troy. This district had a PVI of R+4. The incumbent was Republican Dave Trott, who had represented the district since 2015. He was re-elected to a second term with 53% of the vote in 2016. Trott was not running for re-election in 2018. This race is considered to be competitive; the Cook Political Report has rated this contest as a 'toss up.'

Republican primary

Candidates

Nominee
 Lena Epstein, businesswoman and Michigan co-chair of the 2016 Donald Trump presidential campaign

Eliminated in primary
 Kerry Bentivolio, former U.S. Representative
 Klint Kesto, state representative
 Mike Kowall, state senator
 Rocky Raczkowski, former state representative, nominee for U.S. Senate in 2002 and nominee for MI-09 in 2010

Withdrawn
 Kurt Heise, Plymouth Township Supervisor and former state representative (Endorsed Kowall)

Failed to qualify
 Kristine Bonds, daughter of TV news anchor Bill Bonds. (endorsed Kowall)

Declined
 Ethan Baker, Troy City Councilman and former aide to President Ronald Reagan
 Mike Bouchard, Oakland County Sheriff and nominee for U.S. Senate in 2006
 Patrick Colbeck, state senator (running for Governor)
 Rory Cooper, former communications director to former House Majority Leader Eric Cantor
 Laura Cox, State Representative
 Marty Knollenberg, state senator (running for re-election)
 Mike McCready, State Representative
 Ronna Romney McDaniel, Chairwoman of the Republican National Committee
 Jeff Sawka, former vice chair of the Michigan Republican Party
 Dave Trott, incumbent U.S. Representative

Endorsements

Polling

Primary results

Democratic primary
Michigan's 11th district has been included on the initial list of Republican held seats being targeted by the Democratic Congressional Campaign Committee in 2018.

Candidates

Nominee
 Haley Stevens, former chief of staff for the Presidential Task Force on the Auto Industry

Eliminated in primary
 Tim Greimel, state representative
 Suneel Gupta, businessman and attorney
 Fayrouz Saad, former Detroit director of immigration affairs
 Nancy Skinner, syndicated radio and TV commentator

Failed to qualify
 Daniel Haberman, businessman and attorney

Declined
 Dr. Anil Kumar, physician, candidate for this seat in 2014 and nominee in 2016
 Barbara McQuade, former United States Attorney for the Eastern District of Michigan

Endorsements

Polling

Primary results

Libertarian party
 Leonard Schwartz, attorney

General election

Endorsements

Polling

Predictions

Results

District 12

The 12th district is based in Ann Arbor and the surrounding cities including Ypsilanti, and the western suburbs of Detroit including Dearborn and Lincoln Park. This district has a PVI of D+14. The incumbent is Democrat Debbie Dingell, who has represented the district since 2015. She was re-elected with 64% of the vote in 2016.

Democratic primary

Candidates

Nominee
Debbie Dingell, incumbent U.S. Representative

Primary results

Republican primary

Candidates

Nominee
Jeff Jones

Primary results

General election

Endorsements

Results

District 13

The 13th district is centered on the city of the Detroit and the immediate surrounding suburbs including Dearborn Heights, Garden City, and Westland. This is the most Democratic-friendly district with a PVI of D+32. The seat was vacant for most of 2018, following the resignation of John Conyers in December 2017. A special primary and special general election were held in August and November 2018, on dates coinciding with the already scheduled primary and general elections in a money-saving move by Michigan Governor Rick Snyder.

Conyers represented the district from 2013 to 2017. He previously represented the 14th district from 1993 to 2013, and the 1st district from 1965 to 1993. He was Dean of the United States House of Representatives, and was re-elected to a twenty-seventh term with 77% of the vote in 2016.

Former state representative Rashida Tlaib won the Democratic primary. Tlaib, however, lost the special primary to Brenda Jones, president of the Detroit City Council. Jones served for just over eight weeks before Tlaib was sworn in.

Democratic primary

Candidates

Nominee
 Rashida Tlaib, former state representative

Eliminated in primary
Ian Conyers, state senator
Shanelle Jackson, former state representative and candidate for MI-13 in 2012
 Brenda Jones, president of the Detroit City Council
 Bill Wild, mayor of Westland
Coleman Young II, state senator and candidate for Mayor of Detroit in 2017

Failed to qualify
 John Conyers III, hedge fund manager
 Sherry Gay-Dagnogo, state representative
 Kimberly Hill Knott, government relations, environmental justice
Withdrew
 Michael Gilmore, attorney and activist
Declined
 John Conyers, incumbent U.S. Representative

Endorsements

Polling

Primary results

Republican primary
David Dudenhoefer was the only Republican candidate to announce his run for the Republican nomination, but he failed to qualify. He did, however, run as a write-in candidate. As a result, Tlaib was opposed in the general election only by minor party candidates and write-in candidates.

Candidates

Failed to qualify
 David A. Dudenhoefer, District GOP Chair

Primary results

General election

Endorsements

Results

District 14

The 14th district stretches from the northern Detroit suburbs including Farmington Hills, Southfield, and West Bloomfield, to eastern part of Detroit. This district has a PVI of D+30. The incumbent is Democrat Brenda Lawrence, who has represented the district since 2015.  She was re-elected to a second term with 79% of the vote in 2016.

Democratic primary

Candidates

Nominee
Brenda Lawrence, incumbent U.S. Representative

Primary results

Republican primary

Candidates

Nominee
Marc Herschfus

Primary results

General election

Endorsements

Results

References

External links
Candidates at Vote Smart
Candidates at Ballotpedia
Campaign finance at FEC
Campaign finance at OpenSecrets

Official campaign websites of first district candidates
Jack Bergman (R) for Congress
Matt Morgan (D) for Congress

Official campaign websites of second district candidates
Rob Davidson (D) for Congress
Bill Huizenga (R) for Congress

Official campaign websites of third district candidates
Cathy Albro (D) for Congress
Justin Amash (R) for Congress

Official campaign websites of fourth district candidates
Jerry Hilliard (D) for Congress
John Moolenaar (R) for Congress

Official campaign websites of fifth district candidates
Dan Kildee (D) for Congress
Travis Wines (R) for Congress

Official campaign websites of sixth district candidates
Matt Longjohn (D) for Congress
Fred Upton (R) for Congress

Official campaign websites of seventh district candidates
Gretchen Driskell (D) for Congress
Tim Walberg (R) for Congress

Official campaign websites of eighth district candidates
Mike Bishop (R) for Congress
Elissa Slotkin (D) for Congress

Official campaign websites of ninth district candidates
Andy Levin (D) for Congress
Candius Stearns (R) for Congress

Official campaign websites of tenth district candidates
Kimberly Bizon (D) for Congress
Paul Mitchell (R) for Congress

Official campaign websites of eleventh district candidates
Lena Epstein (R) for Congress
Haley Stevens (D) for Congress

Official campaign websites of twelfth district candidates
Debbie Dingell (D) for Congress
Jeff Jones (R) for Congress

Official campaign websites of thirteenth district candidates
Rashida Tlaib (D) for Congress

Official campaign websites of fourteenth district candidates
Brenda Lawrence (D) for Congress

House
Michigan
2018